Castana is a comune (municipality) in the Province of Pavia in the Italian region Lombardy, located about 50 km south of Milan and about 20 km southeast of Pavia. As of 31 December 2004, it had a population of 739 and an area of 5.2 km².

Castana borders the following municipalities: Canneto Pavese, Cigognola, Montescano, Montù Beccaria, Pietra de' Giorgi, Santa Maria della Versa.

Demographic evolution

References

Cities and towns in Lombardy